Sepedomerus is a genus of marsh flies (insects in the family Sciomyzidae). There are at least four described species in Sepedomerus.

Species
S. bipuncticeps (Malloch, 1933)
S. bipuncticeps trinidadensis (Steyskal, 1951)
S. caeruleus (Melander, 1920)
S. macropus (Walker, 1849) (liverfluke snail predator fly)

References

Further reading

External links

 

Sciomyzidae
Sciomyzoidea genera